The Socialist Party of Minnesota (from 1899 to 1902 the Social Democratic Party of Minnesota; from 1903 to 1913 the Public Ownership Party of Minnesota) was the state affiliate of the Springfield faction of the Social Democratic Party of America, the Socialist Party of America, and finally the Socialist Party USA in the U.S. state of Minnesota.

History 
The state organization was established in 1899, when the Kangaroo faction bolted from the Socialist Labor Party of America in support of the American Federation of Labor and opposition to the internal regime of the SLP under Daniel DeLeon. Its initial electoral appearances were unimpressive, but it began to grow rapidly after 1905, and eventually became, together with the organizations in Wisconsin, Oklahoma, Oregon, North Dakota, Washington, New York, etc., one of the Socialist Party's stronger state organizations—even to the point where, in 1912, half of all of the counties carried by Eugene V. Debs were in Minnesota. But, in spite—or perhaps because—of its rapid growth, the Socialist Party of Minnesota soon also became a heavily contested battlefield for factional disputes within the SPA. This culminated in the period of 1914 though 1919, in which the Socialist Party of Minnesota was decimated by conflicts rooted first in differences of opinion regarding the United States' entry into World War I, and later disagreements over the Bolshevism question following the Russian Revolution. In addition to tearing itself apart, the party was also affected by shifts in public opinion during the First Red Scare, which made it increasingly difficult for the Socialist Party to access an audience.

The Socialist Party of Minnesota continued to exist after 1920, but in a severely weakened state. Many of its former members, such as William Mahoney, Thomas E. Latimer, and Thomas Van Lear, became active in the Farmer-Labor Party of Minnesota, which the former Van Lear faction of the Socialist Party helped to solidify after Van Lear was expelled from the Socialist Party. The Socialist Party of Minnesota itself participated in the Farmer-Labor Party's electoral coalition in state politics from the early 1920s into the mid 1930s. Meanwhile, the state organization continued to achieve ballot access for Norman Thomas in 1928, 1932, 1936, 1940, 1944, and 1948, although it was not able to secure ballot access for Darlington Hoopes in 1952 and 1956.

The Minnesota organization continued to send delegates to the national conventions of the Socialist Party through the 1960s, until the Social Democrats, USA were formed in 1972. Afterward, the Socialist Party of Minnesota reorganized as a part of the Socialist Party USA, sending delegates to the SPUSA's reorganizing convention in 1973. As a unit of the SPUSA, the Socialist Party of Minnesota was able to secure presidential ballot access in Minnesota for Frank Zeidler in 1976 and again for David McReynolds in 1980; however, the organization essentially disappeared at some point prior to 1988.

Nominees for public office

Presidential tickets

Congressional nominees

Senate

2nd district

4th district

5th district

6th district

8th district

9th district

10th district

At-large district

Nominees for state executive offices

Governor

Lieutenant Governor

Secretary of State

State Auditor

State Treasurer

Attorney General

Railroad and Warehouse Commissioner

Officeholders

State senators 

 Andrew Olaf Devold of Minneapolis, District 32 (1919–40)
 Michael Boylan of Virginia, District 61 (1919–27)

 George H. Gardner of Brainerd, District 53 (1915–19)
 Richard Jones of Duluth, District 58 (1915–19)

State representatives 

 John H. Boyd of Crookston, District 66 (1915–17; 1919–21)
 Andrew Olaf Devold of Minneapolis, District 32 (1915–19)
 Nels S. Hillman of Two Harbors, District 51 (1911–15)

 Ernest G. Strand of Two Harbors, District 57 (1917–23)
 James W. Woodfill of Two Harbors, District 57 (1915–17)

Mayors 

 Michael Boylan, Mayor of Virginia (1914–18)
 J. C. Dahl, Mayor of St. Hilaire (1911–13)
 William Jackson, Mayor of Dawson (1919–24)
 H. L. Larson, Mayor of Crookston (1912–14)
 Fred Mahlzan, Mayor of Bemidji (1912–14)

 Adolf Evensen Ousdahl, Mayor of Brainerd (1909–11; 1913–15)
 Ernest G. Strand, Mayor of Two Harbors (1916–17)
 James Sturdevant, Mayor of Tenstrike (1911–13)
 Thomas Van Lear, Mayor of Minneapolis (1917–19)

Aldermen/City Councilors

Brainerd 
 A. G. Anderson (1911–13)
 N. W. Olsen (1911–13)
 R. A. Rennings (1911–13)

Cloquet 
 Frank Yetka (1911–19)

Duluth 
 P. J. Phillips (1912–14)

Minneapolis 
 Albert Bastis (1915–47)
 Lewis Beneke (1921–25)
 Charles Fremont Dight (1915–19)
 A. R. Gisslen (1919–39)
 Theodore Jenson (1917–25)
 Charles Johnson (1913–17)
 Peter J. Pryts (1919–27)
 Charles Rudsdil (1919–27)
 Irving G. Scott (1919–27; 1931–37)
 Alfred Voelker (1913–25)

Two Harbors 
 Ernest G. Strand (1911–16; City Council President 1914–16)

Virginia 
 Michael Boylan (1908–14)

Other officeholders 

 Isaac Biteman, Swanville City Assessor (1912–14)
 Charles M. Floathe, Lake County Register of Deeds (1905–07)
 John Pearson, Lake County Coroner (1905–07)

 W. A. Swanstrom, St. Louis County Commissioner (1917–19)
 Theodore Welte, Clearwater County Commissioner (1912–14)

Other prominent members 
 Clarence Hathaway, labor activist; prominent in the Left Wing Section, Hathaway was certified by State Secretary Dirba as a delegate to the 1919 Emergency National Convention, but became a founding member of the Communist Labor Party of America when the Regulars refused to seat him; later served as an advisory delegate of the Workers Party of America to the Comintern, and eventually a long-time member of the Central Committee of the Communist Party USA
 Algernon Lee, politician, journalist and educator; prominent member of the Kangaroo faction of the SLP, editor of The Tocsin, and one of the founders of the Social Democratic Party of Minnesota; moved to New York City shortly thereafter, running for numerous public offices there
 Anna A. Maley, political activist, journalist and educator; inaugural Secretary of Local Minneapolis; later went on to run for the office of Governor of Washington (becoming the first woman ever to run in a gubernatorial election in Washington), hold office as Chairwoman of the Woman's National Committee, become just the third woman ever to hold a seat on the National Executive Committee of the Socialist Party of America, and serve as an assistant to Minneapolis Mayor Thomas Van Lear
 Yrjö Sirola, Finnish expatriate; served as Finnish Socialist Federation's Work People's College in Smithville from 1910 to 1913; antagonized factional disputes in the Finnish Socialist Federation, which tended to spill over into the Party itself; later returned to Finland where he was a founding member of the Communist Party of Finland
 Carl Skoglund, who was prominent in the Left Section, a founding member of the Communist Party, embraced the views of Leon Trotsky, returned to the SPA after the Trotskyists were driven out of the Communist Party, and eventually became a founding member of the Socialist Workers Party

State Secretaries (incomplete) 
 ?–1904: Spencer M. Holman
 1904–1912: Jay E. Nash
 1912–1914: Thomas E. Latimer
 1914–1915: Fred Miller
 1915–1919: Abraham L. Sugarman
 1919: Charles Dirba
 1919–?: Samuel L. Friedman
 ?–?: Lillian Friedman

See also 
 Social Democratic Party of America
 Socialist Party of America
 Socialist Party USA
 Minnesota Farmer-Labor Party
 National Party (United States)
 Communist Party USA
 Communist Party of America
 Communist Labor Party of America
 Workers Party of America

Notes

References 

Political parties established in 1899
Political parties in Minnesota
History of Minnesota
Defunct political parties in the United States
Minnesota
Minnesota
State and local socialist parties in the United States